Qasemabad-e Pain may refer to:
 Qasemabad-e Pain, Fars
 Qasemabad-e Pain, Gilan
 Qasemabad-e Pain, Sistan and Baluchestan